Bartolomeo Cristofori (1655–1731) was an Italian maker of musical instruments, famous for inventing the piano.

Cristofori may also refer to:
 Cristofori (surname), Italian surname
 Cristofori school, educational institution Kindergarten-3rd grade for the Living Enrichment Center, a New Thought organization

See also 
 Cristofali, Italian surname
 Cristofoli, Italian surname
 Cristofori's Dream, album by David Lanz
 Cristoforia, synonym for Strongygaster, genus of flies